Simaye Azadi (lit. "Face of Freedom"), also known as Iran National Television (INTV) is a satellite television channel by the organisation 'People's Mojahedin Organization of Iran' (PMOI) and National Council of Resistance of Iran (NCRI). It is broadcast from Europe, containing subjects relating to Iran and PMOI. It mostly broadcasts news, but also has documentaries, music, and social and cultural specials.

2009 protests in Iran

There were protests in Iran on the Shi'a holiday of Ashura to protest the outcome of the 2009 Iranian presidential election. Abdolkarim Soroush has identified the moment as a turning point in the Ahmedinejad regime's crackdown on the Iranian Green Movement. Various parties in Iran including Kazem Jalali and the Iranian intelligence service blamed Mojahedin-e Khalq for the unrest, linking the group publicly for the first time with the Green Movement. As opposition leaders like Mir-Hossein Mousavi hurried to dispute the government's characterizations, Massoud Khodabandeh in London wrote a letter accusing the Sima-ye Azadi network of allowing Mojahedin-e Khalq to broadcast from London and that "peaceful demonstrations" were being "fatally undermined from within the UK".

References

External links

Simay Azadi - view in Telegram
Simay Azadi - view in Instagram

Television stations in Iran
Persian-language television stations
Television channels and stations established in 1987